Mehrdad Ghanbari (born November 22, 1989) is an Iranian footballer who plays for Gostaresh Foulad in the Iran Pro League.

Club career

Zob Ahan
In the summer of 2014 Ghanbari with a three-year contract to join Zob Ahan. Mehrdad played the most minutes for Zob Ahan in the 2014–15 season by playing in all matches of the season. But in the season after cruciate ligament injury in the match against Gostaresh in the Hazfi Cup with injury and missed the rest of the season.

Club career statistics

Assists

Honours

Club
Zob Ahan
Hazfi Cup (2): 2014–15, 2015–16
Iranian Super Cup (1): 2016

References

Living people
People from Sari, Iran
Shahrdari Tabriz players
Sanat Sari players
Shahr Khodro F.C. players
Zob Ahan Esfahan F.C. players
Iranian footballers
1989 births
Sportspeople from Sari, Iran
Association football midfielders
Association football fullbacks